The More You Know (TMYK) is an American programming block that is programmed by Hearst Media Production Group (formerly Litton Entertainment), and debuted on October 8, 2016, on NBC as a replacement for the animation block NBC Kids. It airs on Saturday mornings on NBC and Telemundo, and as of 2017 is replayed Sunday mornings on sister network Cozi TV. The block's programs are also available through all of NBC's video on demand venues, including the network's site/app, Hulu, and cable/satellite services.

Based on NBCUniversal's series of public service campaigns of the same name, the three-hour weekend morning block features live-action programming aimed at pre-teens and teens ages 10 to 18 that are designed to meet federally mandated educational programming guidelines.

It is Hearst's fourth E/I-centric programming block across the major U.S. television networks, joining three other Hearst blocks: Weekend Adventure (ABC), Dream Team (CBS), and One Magnificent Morning (The CW).

As of January 6, 2018, a version of the block also airs on NBC's sister network Telemundo under the name MiTelemundo, with all of its programs dubbed in Spanish. Telemundo had previously aired a Spanish-language version of NBC Kids under the same title.

History 
Between February 24, 2016, and March 3, 2016, NBCUniversal announced that it would discontinue its existing weekend morning block NBC Kids, which was programmed by Sprout (now Universal Kids), in favour of The More You Know, a new, three-hour block produced by Litton Entertainment, that would feature live-action educational programming aimed towards preteens, teenagers, and their parents. The block serves as a brand extension of The More You Know—a series of public service campaigns first launched by NBC in 1989.

NBC Kids aired for the final time on September 25, 2016. It was thought to be the last conclusive Saturday morning block across the major U.S. commercial broadcast networks that primarily featured non-educational children's programming. Such content has gradually fallen out of favour because of the E/I rules, as well as shifts in viewing habits towards cable networks and online video on demand services for cartoons and other youth-oriented content. The More You Know debuted two weeks later on October 8, 2016 (October 1 children's programming was pre-empted for NBC network coverage of the 2016 Ryder Cup).

On January 6, 2018, Telemundo relaunched its MiTelemundo block—which had also been programmed by Sprout—with a new schedule consisting of Spanish dubs of The More You Know's programming.

Programming

Current

Former

References 

National Broadcasting Company
Litton Entertainment
Brokered programming
Television programming blocks
 Television shows featuring audio description